Vladimiros Tziortzis (born 6 April 1997) is a Cypriot professional racing driver who currently competes in the NASCAR Whelen Euro Series, driving the No. 5 EuroNASCAR FJ 2020 for Academy Motorsport in the EuroNASCAR 2 class. He previously competed in Formula Renault Eurocup and SMP F4 Championship before making the switch to stock car racing in 2020.

Racing career

At the age of five, Tziortzis took his first driving lessons from his father in the parking lot of GSP Stadium. He began his career on karting a few months later and won the Pancyprian Karting Championship in different classes for 7 consecutive years. He also represented Cyprus in the International ROK Cup Finals for three years, scoring a best result of 13th in 2008.

After receiving an opportunity to test a Formula Renault 2.0 and Euroformula Open Championship car in 2014, Tziortzis made his racing career debut in the Formula Masters Russia championship in 2015 before he moved to SMP F4 Championship on the following year. He finished his first season in thirteenth place, scoring a best finishing result of two sixth places in Moscow. Tziortzis continued to race in SMP F4 for the following season and went on to finish 10th in the standings with a best result of two third-place finishes and one second-place finish, all of which were achieved in the second round at Moscow.

In 2018, Tziortzis made the move to Formula Renault Eurocup after he was signed by Fortec Motorsports. In 2019, he took part in the official Formula Renault Eurocup post-season tests at Yas Marina and Paul Ricard, driving for JD Motorsport. 

Tziortzis made the switch to stock car racing in 2020 after he was signed by NASCAR Whelen Euro Series team Alex Caffi Motorsport to drive the No. 1 Ford Mustang the EuroNASCAR 2 class, becoming the first Cypriot driver to compete in NASCAR. Tziortzis impressed in his debut season, scoring 2 podiums and 8 top-10 finishes with a best finish of second in the third race at Valencia. He finished the year fourth in the standings with 365 points, 54 points behind champion Vittorio Ghirelli. His success allowed Alex Caffi Motorsport, which undergo a rebrand to Academy Motorsport in the off-season, to resign Tziortzis for 2021. Tziortzis scored five podium finishes on his way to finish sixth in the standings that year. He also scored a pole position in the NASCAR GP Belgium at Circuit Zolder, his maiden pole result in the NASCAR Whelen Euro Series. 

For the 2022 season, Tziortzis renewed his contract with Academy Motorsport as he was transferred from the No. 1 car to the team's No. 5 car, acting as the teammate for Patrick Lemarié. Tziortzis finished third in the overall standings, having won the season opening race at Valencia and scored a total of seven podium finishes.

On 14 December 2022, it was announced that Tziortzis will be moving up to the EuroNASCAR PRO division for the 2023 season. Tziortzis will continue to drive Academy Motorsport's No. 5 car for his debut season in EuroNASCAR PRO.

Racing record

Career summary

Complete NASCAR results

Whelen Euro Series - EuroNASCAR 2
(key) Bold - Pole position awarded by fastest qualifying time (in Race 1) or by previous race's fastest lap (in Race 2). Italics - Fastest lap. * – Most laps led.  ^ – Most positions gained.)

References

External links 
 Official Website of Vladimiros Tziortzis
 

1997 births 
Living people 
Cypriot racing drivers 
SMP F4 Championship drivers 
Formula Renault Eurocup drivers 
NASCAR drivers 
People from Nicosia
Formula Renault 2.0 NEC drivers
SMP Racing drivers
Fortec Motorsport drivers